Naile Sultan ("winner"; 30 September 1856 – 18 January 1882), called also Nadile Sultan, was an Ottoman princess, the daughter of Sultan Abdulmejid I and Şayeste Hanım. She was the half-sister of Sultans Murad V, Abdul Hamid II, Mehmed V, and Mehmed VI.

Early life
Naile Sultan was born on 30 September 1856 in the Dolmabahçe Palace. Her father was Sultan Abdulmejid I, and her mother was Şayeste Hanım, an Abkhazian. She had a stillbirth elder brother, Şehzade Abdüllah, and a younger adoptive brother, Mehmed VI. Naile lost her father when she was five.

Marriage
Naile, like her half-sister Behice Sultan, was ill with tuberculosis from an early age and grew up very isolated. She was described as graceful, with a long, gaunt face, very delicate features, dark rimmed eyes, a thin neck and a sweet, sad smile.

In 1876, her mother arranged her marriage to Kabasakal Çerkes Mehmed Pasha, a relative of her, brother of Bidar Kadın (consort of Abdülhamid II) and Shamil, 3rd Imam of Dagestan. He was descrived as a man simple and harsh. The marriage took place on 6 October 1876, during the reign of her brother, Abdul Hamid II. Although Sultan Abdulaziz had ordered her trousseaux, he was completely 
unable to arrange marriage for her. The couple were given a waterfront palace known as "Esma Sultan Mansion", located near the Örtaköy Mosque, as their residence. The married was unhappy: Naile had been against marriage and found her husband unpleasant. They had no children.

Death
Naile Sultan died on 18 January 1882 at the age of twenty five because tuberculosis and unhappiness, and was buried in the mausoleum of new ladies in New Mosque. Her mother Şayeste Hanım donated a large inscription plate depicting Mecca and Medina to the tomb . After her death Mehmed Pasha married first a foreign woman and later Esma Sultan, daughter of Sultan Abdulaziz and Gevheri Kadın. The two moved in Naile Sultan's palace in which Mehmed Pasha and Naile previously lived. Her mother outlived her by thirty years, dying in 1912.

Ancestry

See also
 List of Ottoman princesses

References

Sources

 
 

1856 births
1882 deaths
19th-century deaths from tuberculosis
19th-century Ottoman princesses
Tuberculosis deaths in the Ottoman Empire